Aulonemia chimantaensis is a species of bamboo. 
The species is part of the grass family and is endemic to Latin America.

References

chimantaensis